Konstantinovo is a rural locality (a village) in Sidorovskoye Rural Settlement, Gryazovetsky District, Vologda Oblast, Russia. The population was 4 as of 2002.

Geography 
Konstantinovo is located 32 km east of Gryazovets (the district's administrative centre) by road. Podolnoye is the nearest rural locality.

References 

Rural localities in Gryazovetsky District